The  was a feudal domain in Owari Province, Japan. Historically, "Ogawa" has also been written as 小川 and 小河. The area was controlled by Ogawa Castle.

History
The area was under control of the Mizuno clan since the 15th century. During the Battle of Sekigahara in the Sengoku period, Mizuno Nobumoto, Mizuno Tadamori, and Mizuno Tadashige all fought under the banner of Tokugawa Ieyasu. In 1601, because of the support of the Mizuno clan, Mizuno Wakenaga, was given control of the Ogawa Domain, which produced 9,820 koku. In 1606, Wakenaga was transferred to the nearby Shinshiro Domain, which produced 10,000 koku. The Ogawa Domain was eventually merged with the Owari Domain

Leaders

Mizuno clan
Mizuno Wakenaga

See also
Han system
List of Han

References

Domains of Japan